Rotari (Rotar) is a commune in the Camenca District of Transnistria, Moldova. It is composed of three villages: Bodeni (Бодани, Боданы), Rotari and Socolovca (Соколівка, Соколовка). It has since 1990 been administered as a part of the breakaway Pridnestrovian Moldavian Republic (PMR).

References

Communes of Transnistria
Camenca District